= E. L. Young =

Emma Young is a science and health journalist and author. She has a degree in psychology from the University of Durham and 20 years’ experience working on titles including the Guardian, the Sydney Morning Herald and New Scientist, for which she worked as a senior online reporter in London and Australasian Editor in Sydney. Now employed by the British Psychological Society as a Staff Writer, she also freelance articles and writes books.

== Novels ==
Young is the author of the STORM series, a series that includes the following novels.

1. STORM: The Infinity Code (2007)
2. STORM: The Ghost Machine (2007)
3. STORM: The Black Sphere (2008)
4. STORM: The Viper Club (2008)
5. STORM: The Death Web (2009)

The series follows a group of highly intelligent teenagers who band together to form STORM (Science and Technology to Over-Rule Misery) a covert organisation who use their brainpower to rid the world of various evil threats.

The books incorporate a large element of high-tech gadgetry and science. These plot elements are based in fact, as the author states at the end of each book, along with a summary of the genuine research and inventions which inspire her writing.
